Eslamabad-e Mugui (also Romanized as Eslāmābād-e Mūgū’ī; also known as Eslāmābād, Shāh Bolāgh, and Shāh Bolāgh Mūkū’ī) is a village in Pishkuh-e Mugui Rural District, in the Central District of Fereydunshahr County, Isfahan Province, Iran. At the 2006 census, its population was 247, in 56 families.

References 

Populated places in Fereydunshahr County